The following elections are scheduled for 2023. Some of the elections have not set a year  but are expected in 2023 or no later than 2023. The National Democratic Institute also maintains a calendar of elections around the world.

 2023 United Nations Security Council election
 2023 national electoral calendar
 2023 local electoral calendar

Africa
 2023 Nigerian general election, 25 February
 2023 Mauritanian parliamentary election, 13 and 27 May
 2023 Guinea-Bissau legislative election, 4 June 
 2023 Sierra Leonean general election, June
 2023 Zimbabwean general election, July
 2023 Gabonese general election, August
 2023 Liberian general election, October
 2023 Malian parliamentary election, 29 October
 2023 Malagasy presidential election, November
 2023 Democratic Republic of the Congo general election, 20 December
 2023 Republic of Togo regional and legislative election

Americas
 2023 Antiguan and Barbudan general election, 18 January
 2023 Cuban parliamentary election, 26 March
 2023 Paraguayan general election, 30 April
 Canada
 67th Prince Edward Island general election, 3 April
 31st Alberta general election, 29 May
 43rd Manitoba general election, 3 October
Mexico
Mexico State and Coahuila in 6 June
 2023 Guatemalan general election, 25 June
 2023 Argentine general election, 22 October
 United States
 2023 United States gubernatorial elections
 2023 United States state legislative elections

Asia
 2023 Nepalese presidential election, 9 March
2023 People's Republic of China presidential election, 10 March
 2023 elections in India
 2023 Thai general election, 7 May
 2023 Cambodian general election, 23 July
 2023 Myanmar general election, August
 2023 Maldivian presidential election, 9 September
 2023 Malaysian States election, September
 2023 Philippine barangay and Sangguniang Kabataan elections, October
 2023 Pakistani general election, October
 Next Bangladeshi general election, December

Europe
 Austria
  2023 Lower Austrian state election, 29 January
  2023 Carinthian state election, 5 March
  2023 Salzburg state election, 23 April
 Bulgaria 
 2023 Bulgarian parliamentary election, 2 April
 Cyprus
 2023 Cypriot presidential election, 5 February 2023 (first round) & 12 February 2023 (second round)
 Czechia
 2023 Czech presidential election, 13-14 January 2023 (first round) & 27-28 January 2023 (second round)
 Estonia
 2023 Estonian parliamentary election, 5 March
 Finland
 2023 Finnish parliamentary election, 2 April
 Germany
 2023 Berlin repeat state election, 12 February
 2023 Bremen state election, 14 May
 2023 Bavarian state election, 8 October
 2023 Hessian state election, 8 October
 Greece
 2023 Greek legislative election, July
 Italy
 2023 Lazio regional election, 12-13 February
 2023 Lombard regional election, 12-13 February
 2023 Friuli-Venezia Giulia regional election, 2-3 April
 Lithuania
 2023 Lithuanian municipal elections, 5 March
 Luxembourg
 2023 Luxembourg general election, 8 October
 Moldova
 2023 Gagauzian gubernatorial election, 
 Montenegro
 2023 Montenegrin presidential election, 19 March
 2023 Montenegrin parliamentary election, 11 June
 Netherlands
 2023 Dutch provincial elections, 15 March
 2023 Dutch Senate election, 30 May
 Norway
 2023 Regional and municipal elections, 11 September
 Poland
 2023 Polish parliamentary election, October / November
 Portugal
 2023 Madeiran regional election, October
 Slovakia
 2023 Slovak parliamentary election, 30 September 
 Spain
 2023 Aragonese regional election, 28 May
 2023 Asturian regional election, 28 May
 2023 Balearic regional election, 28 May
 2023 Canarian regional election, 28 May
 2023 Cantabrian regional election, 28 May
 2023 Castilian-Manchegan regional election, 28 May
 2023 Extremaduran regional election, 28 May
 2023 Madrilenian regional election, 28 May
 2023 Murcian regional election, 28 May
 2023 Navarrese regional election, 28 May
 2023 Riojan regional election, 28 May
 2023 Valencian regional election, 28 May
 2023 Spanish general election, December
 Switzerland
 2023 Swiss federal election, October
 Turkey
 2023 Turkish presidential election, 14 May
 2023 Turkish parliamentary election, 14 May
 Ukraine
 2023 Ukrainian parliamentary election, October
United Kingdom
2023 United Kingdom electoral calendar

Oceania
 Australia
 2023 New South Wales state election, 25 March
 New Zealand
2023 New Zealand general election, 14 October
 Marshall Islands
 2023 Marshallese general election, November

References

 
2023
Elections
2020s elections